Petteri Lax (born 12 October 1985 in Huittinen) is a Finnish long jumper.

Achievements

References 
 

1985 births
Living people
Finnish male long jumpers
Sportspeople from Huittinen